The Guará Area of Relevant Ecological Interest is an area of relevant ecological interest in the state of São Paulo, Brazil.

Location

The Guará Area of Relevant Ecological Interest (ARIE) is divided between the municipalities of Iguape (	44.89%) and Ilha Comprida (55.11%) in the state of São Paulo.
It covers the northwestern tip of the island of Ilha Comprida.

History
 
The Guará Area of Relevant Ecological Interest was created by decree 53527 of 8 October 2008, which also created the Litoral Sul Marine Environmental Protection Area.
The two were to have the same management council, which was established on 19 December 2008.
The ARIE is administered by the São Paulo Forestry Foundation (Fundação para Conservação e a Produção Florestal do Estado de São Paulo).

A company was hired in 2013 to prepare a management plan for São Paulo's three marine environmental protection areas (south, center and north) and the ARIE, but the work was not completed. 
In August 2016 a fresh start on a management plan was made by the Ekos Institute.

Notes

Sources

Areas of relevant ecological interest of Brazil
Protected areas established in 2008
Protected areas of São Paulo (state)
2008 establishments in Brazil